Yampil or Yampol is an urban-type settlement in Shepetivka Raion of Khmelnytskyi Oblast, in the Volyn region of western Ukraine. It is located 25 miles SE of Kremenets. Yampil hosts the administration of Yampil settlement hromada, one of the hromadas of Ukraine. Population: 

Until 18 July 2020, Yampil belonged to Bilohiria Raion. The raion was abolished in July 2020 as part of the administrative reform of Ukraine, which reduced the number of raions of Khmelnytskyi Oblast to three. The area of Bilohiria Raion was merged into Shepetivka Raion.

Jewish community
The Jewish community of Yampol dates back to the 15th century, and maybe much earlier than that. Its most distinguished rabbi was Rabbi Yechiel Michel ("Reb Mechele") the Maggid of Zlotshov and his son Reb Yosef of Yampol, also the "Noda Bihuda" (Rabbi Yechezkel Landau) was serving as Rav there before moving to Prague. Yampol is known for its historic Jewish cemetery, where the first Ohel over a Hasidic grave site  was built - over Rabbi Yechiel Michel's grave. (The Ohalim over the graves of Rabbi Michel's masters, the "Baal Shem Tov" and "Magid Of Mezritch", were built years later.) This was copied by all other "Hasidic Dynasties". Rabbi Moshe Landau, the current chief rabbi of Yampola, had pumped in millions of dollars to restore the glory of this historical Jewish town; his mainly residence is in New York and travels there frequently for the holidays or special events he is known as Yampola'r Rebbe.

In 2002 the foundations of the original "Ohel" were discovered by the current Yampola'r Rabbi, and a new building was built over the grave sites, which attracts thousands of visitors each year, especially during the summer months; a modern four-star hotel, named "Promenade" was built next to the old cemetery to accommodate the hundreds and thousands of visitors.

See also
 Bilohiria, the other urban-type settlement in the Bilohiria Raion

References

External links
 Weather in Yampol. Погода в Ямполі.

Urban-type settlements in Shepetivka Raion
Yampola